Sapromyza is a genus of small flies of the family Lauxaniidae.  There are at least 330 described species in Sapromyza.

See also
 List of Sapromyza species

References

Further reading

External links

 
 

Lauxaniidae
Lauxanioidea genera
Taxa named by Carl Fredrik Fallén